Johan Kriek was the defending champion, but did not participate this year.

Martin Davis won the title, defeating Glenn Layendecker 4–6, 6–3, 7–5 in the final.

Seeds

  Henri Leconte (third round)
  Terry Moor (third round)
  Tim Wilkison (third round)
  Guy Forget (quarterfinals)
  Larry Stefanki (third round)
  Brian Teacher (semifinals)
  Bob Green (second round)
  Martin Davis (champion)
  Ken Flach (second round)
  Tarik Benhabiles (second round)
  Hank Pfister (second round)
  Leif Shiras (second round)
  Jay Lapidus (second round)
  Mike Bauer (second round)
  Peter Doohan (quarterfinals)
  Marc Flur (third round)

Draw

Finals

Top half

Section 1

Section 2

Bottom half

Section 3

Section 4

External links
 Main draw

1985 Grand Prix (tennis)
1985 Bristol Open